Bakkah, is a place mentioned in sura 3 ('Āl 'Imrān), ayah 96 of the Qur'an, a verse sometimes translated as: " Verily the first House set apart unto mankind was that at Bakkah, blest, and a guidance unto the worlds",

According to Muslim scholars, Bakkah is an ancient name for Mecca, the most holy city of Islam. (The word Mecca is only used once in the Quran in verse 48:24 ("and it is He who withheld their hands from you and your hands from them within [the area of] Makkah after He caused you to overcome them. And ever is Allah aware of what you do, Seeing."))

Most Muslims believe Mecca and Bakkah are synonyms, but to Muslim scholars there is a distinction: Bakkah refers to the Kaaba and the sacred site immediately surrounding it, while Mecca is the name of the city in which they are both located.

According to Lisān al-'Arab of Ibn Manẓūr, the site of the Kaaba and its surroundings was named Bakkah due to crowding and congestion of people in the area. The Arabic verb bakka (بَكَّ), with double "k", means to crowd like in a bazaar. This is not to be confused with another unrelated Arabic verb bakā (بَكَىٰ) (single k) which is the past tense of yabkī (يَبْكِي), to cry.

Islamic tradition
Islamic tradition identifies Bakkah as the ancient name for the site of Mecca. An Arabic word, its etymology, like that of Mecca, is obscure.

One meaning ascribed to it is "narrow", seen as descriptive of the area in which the valley of the holy places and the city of Mecca are located, pressed in upon as they are by mountains. Widely believed to be a synonym for Mecca, it is said to be more specifically the early name for the valley located therein, while Muslim scholars generally use it to refer to the sacred area of the city that immediately surrounds and includes the Kaaba.

The form Bakkah is used for the name Mecca in the Quran in 3:96, while the form Mecca is used in 48:24. In South Arabic, the language in use in the southern portion of the Arabian Peninsula at the time of Muhammad, the b and m were interchangeable. The Quranic passage using the form Bakkah says: "The first sanctuary appointed for mankind was that at Bakkah, a blessed place, a guidance for the peoples." Other references to Mecca in the Quran (6:92, 42:7) call it Umm al-Qura, meaning "mother of all settlements".

In Islamic tradition, Bakkah is where Hagar and Ishmael (Ismā'īl) settled after being taken by Abraham (Ibrāhīm) to the wilderness, a story parallel to the Bible's Book of Genesis (21:14-21)(but see below for the biblical geography). Genesis tells that Abraham gave Hagar a bottle of water, and that Hagar and Ishmael ran out of water to drink in Beer-Sheba. In Arab tradition, Hagar runs back and forth between two elevated points seven times to search for help before sitting down in despair, at which point the angel speaks as recorded in Genesis 21:14-21:

14 And Abraham arose up early in the morning, and took bread and a bottle of water, and gave it unto Hagar, putting it on her shoulder, and the child, and sent her away; and she departed, and strayed in the wilderness of Beer-sheba. 
15 And the water in the bottle was spent, and she cast the child under one of the shrubs.
16 And she went, and sat her down over against him a good way off, as it were a bow-shot; for she said: 'Let me not look upon the death of the child.' And she sat over against him, and lifted up her voice, and wept.
17 And God heard the voice of the lad; and the angel of God called to Hagar out of heaven, and said unto her: 'What aileth thee, Hagar? fear not; for God hath heard the voice of the lad where he is.
18 Arise, lift up the lad, and hold him fast by thy hand; for I will make him a great nation.'
19 And God opened her eyes, and she saw a well of water; and she went, and filled the bottle with water, and gave the lad drink.
20 And God was with the lad, and he grew; and he dwelt in the wilderness, and became an archer.
21 And he dwelt in the wilderness of Paran; and his mother took him a wife out of the land of Egypt. {P}

As written in the Bible, Hagar walked about one day, few tens of kilometers until her bottle of water ran out in the wilderness of Beer-Sheba (and not about few months, and 1,400 kilometer all the way to Arabia.). Then, Ishmael settled in the Desert of Paran, which is also mentioned few times in the bible, on the way between Egypt to the land of Israel.

The Islamic tradition holds that a spring gushed forth from the spot where Hagar had laid Ishmael, and this spring came to be known as the Well of Zamzam. When Muslims on hajj run between the hills of Safa and Marwah seven times, it is to commemorate Hagar's search for help and the resulting revelation of the well of Zamzam.

In addition to the Islamic tradition that Hagar and Ishmael settled in Bakkah, the Quran relates that Abraham came to Mecca to help his son Ishmael build the Kaaba adjacent to the well of Zamzam. However, in the Bible and ancient Jewish, Christian, and pre-Islamic tradition, Abraham is never mentioned as traveling far south into Arabia (Mekka is about 1400 kilometers south of Hebron, where Abraham is said to be buried). Ishmael is mentioned in Genesis at Abraham's funeral.

Ibn Ishaq, the 8th-century Arab Muslim historian, relates that during the renovation of Kaaba undertaken by the Quraysh before Islam, found an inscription in one of the corners of the foundation of the building that mentions Bakkah. Composed in Syriac, it was incomprehensible to the Quraysh until a Jew translated it for them as follows: "I am Allah, the Lord of Bakka. I created it on the day I created heaven and earth and formed the sun and the moon, and I surrounded it with seven pious angels. It will stand while its two mountains stand, a blessing to its people with milk and water."

The name Bakkah is woven into the kiswa, the cloth covering the Kaaba that is replaced each year before the Hajj.

Valley of the Bakha

Valley of the Bakha ("Valley of the Bakha") is mentioned in the Book of Psalms Chapter 84, in the following passage: 

The original Hebrew phrase for the Valley of the Bakha is  עמק הבכא, emeq ha-Bakha.The word "bakha" is pronounced in terminal stress, and not like Baca – which is penultimate stress. A literal translation is "Valley of the Bakha", although the ancient Greek translation assumed a similar-sounding word בכה – ("bakha") "crying" and translated ἐν τῇ κοιλάδι τοῦ κλαυθμῶνος "valley of mourning". The same Hebrew word בכא ("bakha") is associated with a famous battle in 2 Samuel 5:23-24 in the Valley of Rephaim, about 4-7 kilometers southwest of the present-day Old City of Jerusalem. David is advised to engage the Philistines in battle when he hears the sound of marching in the Bakha trees (translated "mulberry trees" in the King James Version, although the specific tree to which בכא refers is not known—many modern translations suggest "balsam tree").

Revisionist and source critical views 
Tom Holland and Patricia Crone, both revisionist scholars of early Islamic history, postulate that Mecca and Bakkah might not be different spelling variations of the same area, a view commonly held by historical and modern Islamic authors, but rather Bakkah existed in another place.

Holland, in his 2012 book In the Shadow of the Sword, states that Bakkah must have been located somewhere near Byzantine Empire's southern frontier, citing Mecca before Islam being absent in Byzantine records of Hejaz, Quran mentioning Byzantine military expeditions and Quranic imagery (such as Mušrikūn having cattles and gardens of vines, olives, and pomegranates) being vastly different from desert regions of Mecca and being more in line with wetter Syria-Levant region.

Although he asserts that it's not possible to ascertain where Bakkah had exactly stood during the early Islamic history, he later postulates the region of Mamre as a possible location, currently located in West Bank. He identifies Mamre as an ancient Arabic pilgrimage site, citing a mid-7th century account by a Nestorian chronicler that parallels the Quranic description. He also proposes Maqam Ibrahim, two words mentioned in the Quran along with Bakkah, which can be translated as "the place where Abraham stood", not being a stone as it has been identified in the Islamic tradition, but rather he interprets the sentence hinting at the possible Levantine location of Bakkah.

See also 

Mecca

References

Citations

External links
Mecca & Baca Islamic site 

History of Mecca
Quranic places